Monortha is a genus of moths belonging to the family Tortricidae.

Species
Monortha bellavistana Razowski & Pelz, 2007
Monortha corusca Meyrick, 1912 
Monortha funestra Razowski & Becker, 1981 
Monortha illaqueata Meyrick, 1917 
Monortha jurumbaino Razowski & Pelz, 2007
Monortha pleodontia Razowski, 1987
Monortha povedai Razowski & Pelz, 2007
Monortha procera Razowski, 2004

References

 , 1981, Acta Zoologica Cracoviensia 25: 396
 , 2005, World Catalogue of Insects 5
 , 2007, Notes and descriptions of some Neotropical Chlidanotini (Lepidoptera: Tortricidae), Entomologische Zeitung 117 (3): 127-131

External links
tortricidae.com

 
Chlidanotini
Tortricidae genera
Taxa named by Józef Razowski